The Cathedral Basilica of Our Lady of the Rosary, also known as Culiacán Cathedral, is the Catholic cathedral that serves as the headquarters of the diocese of Culiacán, Mexico, although it is not the oldest temple in the municipality, since it dates from 1842. The oldest are the Tabalá and Tacuichamona temples (18th century).

On May 22, 1842, the seventh bishop of Sonora and Sinaloa, Lázaro de la Garza y Ballesteros, authorized construction of the church. After an interruption in the works, these were restarted in 1855 by the Honorable. S. D. D. Pedro Loza y Pardavé. And then the building was interrupted again because of the Reform Movement. Its construction is finally completed in 1885 by the Exmo. Mr. Dn. José de Jesús Uriarte.

Its architectural language is highlighted by predominantly neoclassical elements, with certain eclectic elements from the 19th century.

See also
Roman Catholicism in Mexico
Cathedral Basilica of Our Lady of the Rosary

References

Roman Catholic cathedrals in Mexico
Roman Catholic churches completed in 1855
Church buildings with domes
19th-century Roman Catholic church buildings in Mexico